HD 59612 is a class A5Ib supergiant star in the constellation Puppis. Its apparent magnitude is 4.86 and it is approximately 4,300 light years away based on parallax.

It has one companion, B, at magnitude 10.7 and separation 3.0".  It shares a common proper motion with HD 59612 and is at a similar distance.

References

Puppis
A-type supergiants
BD-22 1897
059612
036431
2874